Pseudogaurotina excellens is a species of the Lepturinae subfamily in the long-horned beetle family. This beetle is distributed in Europe. Adult beetle feeds on Lonicera nigra.

References

Lepturinae
Beetles described in 1874